Chivtaheen as Chiutahi is a village located in Katghar Lalganj, district  Azamgarh, Uttar Pradesh state of India.

Population
In 2011 village has total population was 2841 of which 1521 are males while 1320 are females.

References

Villages in Azamgarh district